Cognex may mean:

 Cognex Corporation, a US manufacturer of machine vision systems
 Cognex, trade name of tacrine, a drug used to treat Alzheimer's disease